Mike Downey (born August 9, 1951 in Chicago Heights, Illinois, and raised in the nearby village of Steger, Illinois) is a retired American newspaper columnist.

From 2003 to 2008, Downey wrote the "In the Wake of the News" column for the Chicago Tribune originated by Ring Lardner in 1913, replacing Skip Bayless in that position at the Tribune. He has also been a columnist in news, entertainment and sports for the Los Angeles Times, Detroit Free Press, Chicago Sun-Times and Chicago Daily News. In retirement, he has written book reviews for the Times and columns for CNN.com.

Downey began a career in journalism at age 15 for a newspaper chain in the south suburbs of Chicago and graduated at 16 from Bloom Township High School in Chicago Heights, Illinois. He did not attend college. He has been a police reporter, entertainment writer, editor, critic and columnist and has covered national political conventions, murder trials and twelve Olympic Games. Among his assignments have been an America's Cup yacht race in Australia, tennis at Wimbledon, British Open golf in Scotland, the Tour de France bicycle race, Stanley Cup hockey finals in Montreal and World Cup soccer in Italy, as well as Pan-American Games competitions in Argentina and Cuba.

He also has been a columnist for The Sporting News and Sport Magazine and for 15 years wrote a humor column for Inside Sports magazine known as "The Good Doctor." He was a featured sports correspondent for KABC radio in Los Angeles and for WJR radio in Detroit and has often been a panelist on ESPN television's weekly talk show, The Sports Reporters. He is a voter for the Baseball Hall of Fame.

In statewide voting by peers, Downey has been selected National Sportscasters and Sportswriters Association sportswriter of the year eleven times, in Illinois (twice), Michigan (twice) and California (seven times).

He was honored for his news column by the Los Angeles Press Club in 1998 and won the 1994 Eclipse Award, thoroughbred racing's highest honor. Downey's writing has appeared in a variety of national magazines including GQ, Parade, Entertainment Weekly, Disney Adventures, American Way, Reader's Digest and TV Guide.

He was included as a character in the Elmore Leonard novel Be Cool.

Downey resides in Rancho Mirage, California. He is married to singer Gail Martin, daughter of the entertainer Dean Martin.

References

1951 births
Living people
American columnists
Writers from Chicago
Chicago Sun-Times people
Journalists from Illinois
Sportspeople from the Chicago metropolitan area
Detroit Free Press people
Chicago Daily News people
Los Angeles Times people
People from Chicago Heights, Illinois
People from Steger, Illinois
Sportswriters from Illinois